Tanaquil Le Clercq (October 2, 1929 – December 31, 2000) was an American ballet dancer, born in Paris, France, who became a principal dancer with the New York City Ballet at the age of nineteen. Her dancing career ended abruptly when she was stricken with polio in Copenhagen during the company's European tour in 1956. Eventually regaining most of the use of her arms and torso, she remained paralyzed from the waist down for the rest of her life.

Biography
Le Clercq was the daughter of Jacques Le Clercq, a European American intellectual, professor of French at Queens College in the 1950s-early 1970s, and his American wife, Edith (née Whittemore); she studied ballet with Mikhail Mordkin before auditioning for the School of American Ballet in 1941, where she won a scholarship. 

When Le Clercq was fifteen years old, famed choreographer George Balanchine asked her to perform with him in a dance he choreographed for a polio charity benefit. In an eerie portent of things to come (Le Clercq would contract polio at twenty-seven and never recover mobility in her legs), he played a character named Polio, and Le Clercq was his victim who became paralyzed and fell to the floor. Then, children tossed dimes at her character, prompting her to get up and dance again.

Le Clercq was considered Balanchine's first ballerina: she was trained in his style from childhood and she was one of his most important muses, together with dancers like Maria Tallchief and, later on, Suzanne Farrell. During Le Clercq's tenure with the company, Balanchine, Jerome Robbins, and Merce Cunningham all created roles for her. 

Years later, after being stricken with polio, she reemerged as a dance teacher and as one student recalled, "used her hands and arms as legs and feet." She taught at Dance Theater of Harlem from 1974 to 1982. 

Le Clercq's life and career are profiled in the 2013 documentary film, Afternoon of a Faun: Tanaquil Le Clercq. Novelist Varley O'Connor created a fictional account of the relationship between Tanaquil LeClercq and George Balanchine in The Master's Muse (Scribner 2012).

Personal life
Tanaquil Le Clercq was the fourth and last wife (1952–1969) of George Balanchine, the pioneer of American ballet. He obtained a quick divorce from her to woo Suzanne Farrell (who refused Balanchine's marriage proposal and went on to marry another Balanchine dancer, Paul Mejia). 

Le Clercq died of pneumonia in New York Hospital at the age of 71.

Bibliography

Acocella, Joan (2007). Twenty-eight Artists and Two Saints: Essays. New York: Pantheon.

Notes

References

External links
Archive film of Tanaquil Le Clercq and Nicholas Magallanes in 1951 at Jacob's Pillow
Muse of many faces: Ballerina Tanaquil Le Clercq's life and times
 Tanaquil Le Clercq and Jacques d'Amboise performing Afternoon of a Faun - Pas de Deux (1953) for "PBS American Masters" on www.pbs.org

1929 births
2000 deaths
French emigrants to the United States
Prima ballerinas
Dancers from Paris
New York City Ballet principal dancers
People with polio
School of American Ballet alumni
Deaths from pneumonia in New York City